Edward Gargan (July 17, 1902 – February 19, 1964) was an American film and television actor.

Career
He was born of Irish parents in Brooklyn, New York. He was the elder brother of actor William Gargan.

As soon as he had left college, he went onto the stage and had extensive acting experience gained in plays like My Maryland, Rose Marie, and Good News before going into films. His Broadway credits include Face the Music (1931), Polly of Hollywood (1926) and Black Boy (1926).

In 1930, Gargan played Patrolman Mulligan in a production of Strictly Dishonorable.

Many of his appearances were uncredited.

Personal life and death
Gargan was married to the former Catherine Conlan. He died February 19, 1964, at Columbus Hospital in New York City. He was 62. He is buried in Holy Cross Cemetery in Brooklyn, New York.

Selected filmography

 Tarnished Lady (1931) – Al – Man in Bar (uncredited)
 The Girl Habit (1931) – Detective
 The Girl in 419 (1933) – Lt. 'Babs' Riley
 Gambling Ship (1933) – Deputy (uncredited)
 Pilgrimage (1933) – Marty – Reporter (uncredited)
 Mary Stevens, M.D. (1933) – 'Captain' the Policeman (uncredited)
 Three-Cornered Moon (1933) – Mike the Landlord (uncredited)
 Turn Back the Clock (1933) – Pete – Checkers Player (uncredited)
 Bombshell (1933) – Second Immigration Officer (uncredited)
 Ace of Aces (1933) – Whitaker – Mechanic (uncredited)
 Jimmy and Sally (1933) – Married Meatpacker (uncredited)
 Gallant Lady (1933) – Policeman on Street (uncredited)
 Queen Christina (1933) – Drinker (uncredited)
 Fugitive Lovers (1934) – Policeman (uncredited)
 David Harum (1934) – Bill Montague (uncredited)
 Good Dame (1934) – House Detective (uncredited)
 Three on a Honeymoon (1934) – Poker Player (uncredited)
 Registered Nurse (1934) – Officer Pat O'Brien
 Wild Gold (1934) – Eddie Sparks
 Side Streets (1934) – Cop (uncredited)
 She Was a Lady (1934) – Bull (uncredited)
 Belle of the Nineties (1934) – Stogie
 The Lemon Drop Kid (1934) – Sullivan (uncredited)
 She Had to Choose (1934) – Higgins
 Port of Lost Dreams (1934) – Porky the Freda's 'Crew'
 We Live Again (1934) – Warden's Assistant (uncredited)
 Behold My Wife! (1934) – Det. Connolly (uncredited)
 The Band Plays On (1934) – Lumberjack (uncredited)
 Bachelor of Arts (1934) – Policeman (uncredited)
 A Notorious Gentleman (1935) – Detective (uncredited)
 The Gilded Lily (1935) – Subway Guard
 One New York Night (1935) – Trench (uncredited)
 Behind the Green Lights (1935) – Moran – a Cop
 Hold 'Em Yale (1935) – Detective Kelly (uncredited)
 Ginger (1935) – Detective (uncredited)
 So Red the Rose (1935) – Cavalryman (uncredited)
 The Irish in Us (1935) – Tough Guy Slugged by Danny (uncredited)
 Man on the Flying Trapeze (1935) – Patrolman No.1
 We're in the Money (1935) – Policeman Clancy O'Rourke
 Two for Tonight (1935) – Taxi Driver (uncredited)
 Here Comes Cookie (1935) – Policeman (uncredited)
 Barbary Coast (1935) – Bill – Henchman (uncredited)
 Hands Across the Table (1935) – Pinky Kelly (uncredited)
 False Pretenses (1935) – Mike O'Reilly
 Miss Pacific Fleet (1935) – Shore Patrol Chief with Telephone (uncredited)
 The Bride Comes Home (1935) – Cab Driver
 Ceiling Zero (1936) – Doc Wilson
 Anything Goes (1936) – Detective
 Dangerous Waters (1936) – Bosun
 The Walking Dead (1936) – Guard Sitting Outside Warden's Office (uncredited)
 Sutter's Gold (1936) – Wagon Driver (uncredited)
 Boulder Dam (1936) – Pa's Guest (uncredited)
 Mr. Deeds Goes to Town (1936) – Bodyguard (uncredited)
 Roaming Lady (1936) – Andy
 Hearts in Bondage (1936) – 'Mac' McPherson
 Nobody's Fool (1936) – Tom
 A Son Comes Home (1936) – Second Truck Driver (uncredited)
 Grand Jury (1936) – Police Officer Tim Burke
 My Man Godfrey (1936) – Detective (uncredited)
 Stage Struck (1936) – Rordan
 Wives Never Know (1936) – Officer (uncredited)
 Valiant Is the Word for Carrie (1936) – (uncredited)
 Two in a Crowd (1936) – Policeman (uncredited)
 Wild Brian Kent (1936) – Joe – Waiter
 Under Your Spell (1936) – Detective (uncredited)
 Great Guy (1936) – Al
 We're on the Jury (1937) – Police Officer Clark
 The Great O'Malley (1937) – Policeman Driving Radio Car (uncredited)
 Nancy Steele Is Missing! (1937) – Guard (uncredited)
 When Love Is Young (1937) – Policeman (uncredited)
 The Man Who Found Himself (1937) – Policeman in Park (uncredited)
 Jim Hanvey, Detective (1937) – O.R. Smith
 You Can't Buy Luck (1937) – Butch (uncredited)
 The Go Getter (1937) – Police Officer Riley (uncredited)
 San Quentin (1937) – 'Captain' Road Gang Guard (uncredited)
 Wake Up and Live (1937) – Murphy, Tour Guide Supervisor
 High, Wide and Handsome (1937) – Foreman
 Big City (1937) – Policeman with Banana (uncredited)
 Back in Circulation (1937) – Policeman at Train Wreck (uncredited)
 Madame X (1937) – Mate of Dorcas (uncredited)
 That's My Story (1937) – John
 A Girl with Ideas (1937) – Eddie
 Danger Patrol (1937) – John Donovan
 Thoroughbreds Don't Cry (1937) – Park Policeman (uncredited)
 45 Fathers (1937) – Policeman (uncredited)
 Wallaby Jim of the Islands (1937) – Buck Morgan
 Bringing Up Baby (1938) – Zoo Official (uncredited)
 Love on a Budget (1938) – Big Furniture Mover (uncredited)
 Goodbye Broadway (1938) – Bus Driver (uncredited)
 Crime School (1938) – Officer Hogan (credited as Ed Gargan)
 Rascals (1938) – Police Officer (uncredited)
 The Devil's Party (1938) – Police Sgt. Enders (uncredited)
 The Rage of Paris (1938) – Truck Driver (uncredited)
 Men Are Such Fools (1938) – 2nd Policeman in Car (uncredited)
 The Amazing Dr. Clitterhouse (1938) – Police Sergeant (uncredited)
 Gateway (1938) – Guard (uncredited)
 Keep Smiling (1938) – First Electrician (uncredited)
 The Texans (1938) – Sgt. Grady (uncredited)
 Give Me a Sailor (1938) – Chief Petty Officer (uncredited)
 Carefree (1938) – Policeman (uncredited)
 Time Out for Murder (1938) – Apartment Doorman (uncredited)
 Straight, Place and Show (1938) – Detective Globe
 Five of a Kind (1938) – Tim Kelly – Bartender (uncredited)
 Thanks for the Memory (1938) – Flanahan
 Annabel Takes a Tour (1938) – Longshoreman at Dance
 Spring Madness (1938) – Jim (uncredited)
 Up the River (1938) – Tiny
 Road Demon (1938) – Beefy Hogan (uncredited)
 While New York Sleeps (1938) – Police Sgt. White
 Newsboys' Home (1938) – Policeman (uncredited)
 Boy Trouble (1939) – Cop (uncredited)
 Honolulu (1939) – 2nd Detective
 Cafe Society (1939) – Cop (uncredited)
 Yes, My Darling Daughter (1939) – Police Officer
 Blondie Meets the Boss (1939) – Garden Café Doorman (uncredited)
 The Saint Strikes Back (1939) – Pinky Budd
 Winner Take All (1939) – Bettor (uncredited)
 The Family Next Door (1939) – Cop (uncredited)
 The Flying Irishman (1939) – Jim 'J.R.' Robinson (uncredited)
 Fixer Dugan (1939) – Jake
 For Love or Money (1939) – Bubbles
 Lucky Night (1939) – Policeman
 Boy Friend (1939) – Bugsie (uncredited)
 It Could Happen to You (1939) – Bartender (uncredited)
 They All Come Out (1939) – George Jacklin – 'Bugs'
 The Spellbinder (1939) – Tom – Taxi Driver (uncredited)
 Night Work (1939) – Police Officer Flannigan
 $1,000 a Touchdown (1939) – Ironmansky (uncredited)
 On Your Toes (1939) – First Policeman (uncredited)
 Pack Up Your Troubles (1939) – Sentry
 20,000 Men a Year (1939) – Dunk
 Heaven with a Barbed Wire Fence (1939) – Truck Driver (uncredited)
 Another Thin Man (1939) – Detective Quinn (uncredited)
 A Child Is Born (1939) – Officer Riley – Police Guard (uncredited)
 Brother Rat and a Baby (1940) – Taxicab Driver
 Wolf of New York (1940) – W. Thornton Upshaw
 The Saint's Double Trouble (1940) – Police Sergeant (uncredited)
 Castle on the Hudson (1940) – Death Row Guard (uncredited)
 Northwest Passage (1940) – Capt. Butterfield (uncredited)
 Charlie Chan in Panama (1940) – Plant Workman (uncredited)
 Adventure in Diamonds (1940) – Lou
 Three Cheers for the Irish (1940) – Policeman O'Brien (uncredited)
 Road to Singapore (1940) – Bill – Sailor (uncredited)
 Johnny Apollo (1940) – Detective (uncredited)
 It All Came True (1940) – Police Desk Sergeant (uncredited)
 Two Girls on Broadway (1940) – Policeman Guarding Courtroom (uncredited)
 Buck Benny Rides Again (1940) – Policeman (uncredited)
 The Doctor Takes a Wife (1940) – George – Doorman (uncredited)
 An Angel from Texas (1940) – New York Policeman (uncredited)
 I Can't Give You Anything But Love, Baby (1940) – Policeman at Robbery (uncredited)
 Susan and God (1940) – Cabbie (uncredited)
 Queen of the Mob (1940) – Bank Guard
 Girl from God's Country (1940) – Poker Player #1
 Girl from Avenue A (1940) – First Doorman (uncredited)
 City for Conquest (1940) – Joe – Foreman (uncredited)
 Spring Parade (1940) – Inga – the Fortune Teller
 The Villain Still Pursued Her (1940) – Bartender (uncredited)
 Slightly Tempted (1940) – Gottlieb, Policeman (uncredited)
 Tugboat Annie Sails Again (1940) – Policeman (uncredited)
 Street of Memories (1940) – Mike Sullivan
 The Lone Wolf Keeps a Date (1940) – Chimp
 Go West (1940) – Railroad Ticket Seller (uncredited)
 This Thing Called Love (1940) – Police Officer (uncredited)
 The San Francisco Docks (1940) – Hank
 Bowery Boy (1940) – Mr. Hanson
 Four Mothers (1941) – Harry (uncredited)
 Tall, Dark and Handsome (1941) – Store Detective (uncredited)
 Flight from Destiny (1941) – Hotel Doorman (uncredited)
 Meet the Chump (1941) – Muldoon
 Here Comes Happiness (1941) – Joe
 Men of Boys Town (1941) – Detective Arresting Whitey (uncredited)
 Thieves Fall Out (1941) – Kane
 Affectionately Yours (1941) – Traffic Policeman (uncredited)
 Million Dollar Baby (1941) – Customs Officer (uncredited)
 Tight Shoes (1941) – Blooch
 Three Sons o' Guns (1941) – Sylvester, the Milkman (uncredited)
 Tillie the Toiler (1941) – Policeman
 Ice-Capades (1941) – Joe, the Bouncer (uncredited)
 Lady Be Good (1941) – Policeman (scenes deleted)
 Navy Blues (1941) – Hawaii Club Proprietor (uncredited)
 Niagara Falls (1941) – Chuck
 Ellery Queen and the Murder Ring (1941) – Dumb Henchman (uncredited)
 The Night of January 16th (1941) – Cop Who Helps the Drunk (uncredited)
 A Date with the Falcon (1942) – Detective Bates (uncredited)
 Fly-by-Night (1942) – Officer Charlie Prescott
 Dr. Kildare's Victory (1942) – Willie Brooks
 What's Cookin'? (1942) – Minor Role (uncredited)
 My Favorite Blonde (1942) – Mulrooney
 Meet the Stewarts (1942) – Moving Man
 Flying with Music (1942) – Joe
 The Falcon Takes Over (1942) – Detective Bates (uncredited)
 Miss Annie Rooney (1942) – Policeman (uncredited)
 Ten Gentlemen from West Point (1942) – Bombardier (uncredited)
 They All Kissed the Bride (1942) – Private Policeman
 Lady in a Jam (1942) – Deputy
 Blondie for Victory (1942) – Sergeant
 A-Haunting We Will Go (1942) – Police Lt. Foster
 Between Us Girls (1942) – Cab Driver (uncredited)
 My Sister Eileen (1942) – Murphy – Policeman (uncredited)
 The Falcon's Brother (1942) – Detective Bates
 Mrs. Wiggs of the Cabbage Patch (1942) – Doorman (uncredited)
 My Heart Belongs to Daddy (1942) – Mr. Johnson – Detective (uncredited)
 Over My Dead Body (1942) – Police Sergeant
 Andy Hardy's Double Life (1942) – Motorcycle Policeman (uncredited)
 The Meanest Man in the World (1943) – Hotel Detective (uncredited)
 Something to Shout About (1943) – Detective Stone (uncredited)
 They Got Me Covered (1943) – Cop at Bridge (uncredited)
 Prairie Chickens (1943) – Bus Driver (uncredited)
 The Falcon Strikes Back (1943) – Detective Bates
 Tahiti Honey (1943) – George, the Bartender
 Taxi, Mister (1943) – Willie, Court Bailiff / Cabby / Ballplayer (uncredited)
 Hit the Ice (1943) – Bank Policeman (uncredited)
 The Falcon in Danger (1943) – Detective Bates
 The West Side Kid (1943) – Donovan
 Thank Your Lucky Stars (1943) – Doorman (uncredited)
 Princess O'Rourke (1943) – Slugged Pedestrian (uncredited)
 My Kingdom for a Cook (1943) – Duke
 The Falcon and the Co-eds (1943) – Detective Bates
 In Old Oklahoma (1943) – Kelsey – Waiter (uncredited)
 The Falcon Out West (1944) – Detective Bates
 The Great Alaskan Mystery (1944, Serial) – Kurtz [Chs. 4–13]
 Once Upon a Time (1944) – Cop Outside Flynn Theater (uncredited)
 Detective Kitty O'Day (1944) – Mike
 Song of the Open Road (1944) – Poultry Truck Driver (uncredited)
 San Fernando Valley (1944) – Keno
 San Diego, I Love You (1944) – Policeman (uncredited)
 The Thin Man Goes Home (1944) – Mickey Finnegan (uncredited)
 Music for Millions (1944) – Detective (uncredited)
 High Powered (1945) – Cal Williams
 See My Lawyer (1945) – Furniture Mover (uncredited)
 Earl Carroll Vanities (1945) – Policeman
 It's in the Bag! (1945) – Chair Delivery Man (uncredited)
 Diamond Horseshoe (1945) – Grogan – Stagehand (uncredited)
 The Bullfighters (1945) – Vasso – Man Practicing Speech (uncredited)
 The Great John L. (1945) – (scenes deleted)
 Twice Blessed (1945) – Outraged Baseball Fan (uncredited)
 That's the Spirit (1945) – Cop (uncredited)
 A Sporting Chance (1945) – Mike Ryan
 Dangerous Partners (1945) – Police Sgt. at Kempen's Apartment (uncredited)
 Wonder Man (1945) – Policeman in Park
 The Naughty Nineties (1945) – Baxter – Saloon Bartender (uncredited)
 The Beautiful Cheat (1945) – Blue Moon Manager
 Guest Wife (1945) – Waiter (uncredited)
 Her Highness and the Bellboy (1945) – 1st Cop
 Sing Your Way Home (1945) – Jailer
 She Wouldn't Say Yes (1945) – Cab Driver (uncredited)
 Life with Blondie (1945) – Dogcatcher (uncredited)
 Follow That Woman (1945) – Butch
 Pardon My Past (1945) – Policeman at Pemberton Home (uncredited)
 Gay Blades (1946) – Bartender
 Deadline at Dawn (1946) – Bouncer (uncredited)
 Little Giant (1946) – Policeman (uncredited)
 Cinderella Jones (1946) – Riley
 Blonde Alibi (1946) – Police Sergeant (uncredited)
 Behind the Mask (1946) – Detective Dixon
 The Dark Horse (1946) – Eustace Kelly
 The Inner Circle (1946) – Parking Ticket Cop
 Faithful in My Fashion (1946) – Cop (scenes deleted)
 Crack-Up (1946) – Cop in Arcade (uncredited)
 The Brasher Doubloon (1947) – Truck Driver (uncredited)
 The Ghost Goes Wild (1947) – Newsstand Man
 It Happened on Fifth Avenue (1947) – Policeman in Park (uncredited)
 That's My Gal (1947) – Mike
 Saddle Pals (1947) – Jailer
 Web of Danger (1947) – Dolan, Restaurant Owner
 Little Miss Broadway (1947) – Uncle George
 The Trouble with Women (1947) – Mr. Fogarty (uncredited)
 Exposed (1947) – Big Mac
 Linda, Be Good (1947) – Frankie
 Campus Honeymoon (1948) – Motorcycle Cop
 Scudda Hoo! Scudda Hay! (1948) – Ted (uncredited)
 Are You with It? (1948) – Spectator (uncredited)
 Smart Woman (1948) – Interrogator at Police Line-Up (uncredited)
 The Dude Goes West (1948) – Train Conductor
 Waterfront at Midnight (1948) – Minor Role (uncredited)
 The Babe Ruth Story (1948) – Policeman (uncredited)
 Daredevils of the Clouds (1948) – Tap–It Bowers
 A Southern Yankee (1948) – Male Nurse (scenes deleted)
 You Gotta Stay Happy (1948) – Detective (uncredited)
 Strike It Rich (1948) – Mack – the Bartender
 Adventures of Gallant Bess (1948) – Deputy
 Blondie's Secret (1948) – The Butcher (uncredited)
 Hold That Baby! (1949) – Burton – Policeman
 Mighty Joe Young (1949) – Bar Patron (uncredited)
 That Midnight Kiss (1949) – Traffic Cop (uncredited)
 Love Happy (1949) – Cop Who Captures Harpo (uncredited)
 Feudin' Rhythm (1949) – Fire Chief (uncredited)
 Key to the City (1950) – S.F. Cop – Fire Escape (uncredited)
 The Kid from Texas (1950) – Blacksmith (uncredited)
 Belle of Old Mexico (1950) – Sam
 Square Dance Katy (1950) – Police Officer Casey
 Father of the Bride (1950) – Moving Man with Door (uncredited)
 Triple Trouble (1950) – Police Officer Murphy
 Hit Parade of 1951 (1950) – Garrity
 Valentino (1951) – Cop in Central Park (uncredited)
 Bedtime for Bonzo (1951) – Policeman Bill
 Cuban Fireball (1951) – Ritter
 Abbott and Costello Meet the Invisible Man (1951) – Milt (uncredited)
 Little Egypt (1951) – Police Sergeant (uncredited)

References

External links

 
 

1964 deaths
American male film actors
20th-century American male actors
People from Brooklyn
Male actors from New York City
American people of Irish descent
1902 births